Salvador Ferrando (1835–1908) was a Mexican painter from Tlacotalpan who specialized in portraits and landscapes, mostly of the Papaloapan and Tlacotalpan regions. There is a museum named after him in his hometown, which contains a number of his works. Many of Ferrando's works were rescued by an architect named Humberto Aguirre Tinoco, and  number of them can be seen at the Museo de Arte de Veracruz in the city of Orizaba.

References

Mexican landscape painters
Mexican portrait painters
1908 deaths
1835 births
Artists from Veracruz
19th-century Mexican painters
Mexican male painters
People from Tlacotalpan
19th-century Mexican male artists